Jehu Femi Chesson II (born December 29, 1993) is a Liberian professional American football wide receiver who is a free agent. He played college football at Michigan, and was selected by the Kansas City Chiefs in the fourth round of the 2017 NFL Draft. He owns the school record for most receiving touchdowns in a game, tied with Derrick Alexander with four. His 207 receiving yards against Indiana during the 2015 season also ranks as the third-highest total in school history.

Early years
Chesson was born in Monrovia, Liberia, on December 29, 1993, and grew up during the First Liberian Civil War. His father, Jehu Chesson Sr., worked in the financial industry but joined Lutheran World Service as a relief worker during the war. Chesson moved with his family to neighboring Côte d'Ivoire at the age of two and then to St. Louis, Missouri, three years later, where his father took a job working for MasterCard.

Chesson grew up in St. Louis and began playing American football in the eighth grade. He attended Ladue Horton Watkins High School where he played at the wide receiver position. He caught 53 passes for 757 yards as a senior, and he was selected as a first-team All-Missouri player. He was also the Missouri high school champion in the 300-meter hurdles in 2011.

College career
Chesson accepted a scholarship to play football at the University of Michigan. As a freshman in 2012, he redshirted and did not see game action. As a sophomore in 2013, he had a 33-yard touchdown on his first collegiate reception and caught 15 passes for 221 yards. As a junior in 2014, he caught 14 passes for 154 yards.

Chesson also saw action on kickoff returns, and in an October 10, 2015, game against Northwestern, he returned the opening kickoff 96 yards for a touchdown. Chesson's return against Northwestern was the first kickoff returned for a touchdown by a Michigan player since Darryl Stonum accomplished the feat in 2009 against Notre Dame.

On November 14, 2015, Chesson had a breakout game, catching 10 passes for 207 yards and four touchdowns against Indiana. Three of the four touchdowns were scored in the first half, and the fourth came on a fourth-down play with two seconds remaining in regulation and Michigan trailing 34 to 27.  Chesson's 207 receiving yards ranks as the third highest single-game total in Michigan football history. He also tied Derrick Alexander's Michigan single-game record of four receiving touchdowns set in 1992. He was subsequently named the Co-Big Ten Offensive Player of the Week, along with Jake Rudock. Chesson and Rudock became the second-ever pair of teammates in conference history to share the Big Ten Offensive Player of the Week Award.

During the 2015 season, Chesson led Michigan with 1,085 all-purpose yards and 12 touchdowns. He established new career highs with 50 receptions and 764 receiving yards and nine receiving touchdowns. He also had 166 return yards and one touchdown on four kick returns and 155 rushing yards and two touchdowns on eight carries (19.4 yards per carry). Following the 2015 season, Chesson was named to the All-Big Ten offensive first-team, and was awarded the Bo Schembechler Most Valuable Player Award, by his teammates.

Professional career

Kansas City Chiefs

Chesson was drafted by the Kansas City Chiefs in the fourth round, 139th overall, in the 2017 NFL Draft. In Week 9, against the Dallas Cowboys, he recorded a 10-yard reception for the first catch of his NFL career. He finished his rookie season with two receptions for 18 yards and no touchdowns. He was waived on September 1, 2018.

Washington Redskins
Chesson was signed to the Washington Redskins' practice squad on September 5, 2018. He was promoted to the active roster on September 12, 2018, but was waived on September 17 and returned to the practice squad the following day. He was promoted to the active roster again on October 18 after injuries to Jamison Crowder and Paul Richardson.

Chesson was waived on August 31, 2019, but was signed to the practice squad the following day. His practice squad contract with the team expired on January 6, 2020.

New York Jets
Chesson signed a futures contract with the New York Jets on January 9, 2020. He was waived on September 5, 2020.

See also
 Michigan Wolverines football statistical leaders

References

External links
Michigan Wolverines bio
Washington Redskins bio

1993 births
American football wide receivers
Kansas City Chiefs players
Washington Redskins players
New York Jets players
Living people
Ladue Horton Watkins High School alumni
Michigan Wolverines football players
Players of American football from St. Louis
Sportspeople from Monrovia
American people of Liberian descent
Liberian players of American football